Kuta Raja also written as Koetaradja, Kotaraja and Kota Raja, was the name the Dutch gave to the capital of the Aceh Sultanate in the Aceh region of Sumatra. The name translates to mean "Kingtown" or "Princetown". It became part of the Dutch East Indies after the Aceh War. Dutch rule ended with World War II. After Indonesia became independent the city was renamed Banda Aceh.

Kuta Raja is now the name a district in the city of Banda Aceh. Villages in the district include:

 Lampaseh City
 Merduati
 Keudah
 Peulanggahan
 Java Gampong
 Gampong Pande

History 
Kuta Raja was a powerful economic center as a sultanate in the 16th century. The Dutch took over much of Sumatra from British rule in the late 19th century. Kuta Raja was conquered from its rule as a sultanate in the late 19th century.

Gallery 

Dutch East Indies